Longchuan railway station serves Longchuan County in the city of Heyuan in Guangdong province, China.

See also
Longchuan West railway station

Railway stations in Guangdong
Stations on the Beijing–Kowloon Railway